This is a list of election results for the electoral district of Millicent in South Australian elections.

Members for Millicent

Election results

Elections in the 1970s

Elections in the 1960s

Preferences were not distributed.

This result was declared void by the Court of Disputed Returns and a by-election was held, in which Labor retained the seat.

Elections in the 1950s

References

South Australian state electoral results by district